The 1994 Regal Scottish Masters was a professional non-ranking snooker tournament that took place between 20 and 25 September 1994 at the Motherwell Civic Centre in Motherwell, Scotland.

Ken Doherty won the tournament by defeating Stephen Hendry 9–7 in the final.

Prize fund
The breakdown of prize money for this year is shown below: 
Winner: £50,000
Runner-up: £25,000
Semi-final: £13,500
Quarter-final: £7,750
Round 1: £4,250
Highest break: £5,000
Total: £150,000

Main draw

Century breaks

 137, 111  Ken Doherty
 119, 115, 102  Ronnie O'Sullivan
 102  Steve Davis

References

1994
Masters
Scottish Masters
Scottish Masters